East Wicklow, a division of County Wicklow, was a parliamentary constituency  in Ireland, represented in the Parliament of the United Kingdom. From 1885 to 1922 it returned one Member of Parliament (MP) to the House of Commons of the United Kingdom of Great Britain and Ireland.

Until the 1885 general election the area was part of the Wicklow constituency. From 1922 it was not represented in the UK Parliament, as it was no longer in the UK.

Boundaries
This constituency comprised the eastern part of County Wicklow. In 1918, the boundary of the constituency was expanded to include that part of the Bray urban district transferred from County Dublin to County Wicklow under the 1898 Local Government (Ireland) Act.

1885–1918: The baronies of Arklow, Newcastle and Rathdown, and that part of the barony of Ballinacor North contained within the parish of Calary.

1918–1922: The existing East Wicklow constituency, together with that part of the existing South Dublin constituency contained within the administrative county of Wicklow.

Members of Parliament

Elections

Elections in the 1880s

Elections in the 1890s

Sweetman resigns to re-stand as a Parnellite Nationalist, prompting a by-election.

Elections in the 1900s

Cogan resigns, causing a by-election.

Elections in the 1910s

Muldoon resigns, prompting a by-election.

References

The Parliaments of England by Henry Stooks Smith (1st edition published in three volumes 1844–50), 2nd edition edited (in one volume) by F.W.S. Craig (Political Reference Publications 1973)

Historic constituencies in County Wicklow
Westminster constituencies in County Wicklow (historic)
Dáil constituencies in the Republic of Ireland (historic)
Constituencies of the Parliament of the United Kingdom established in 1885
Constituencies of the Parliament of the United Kingdom disestablished in 1922
1885 establishments in Ireland
1922 disestablishments in Ireland